Psathi is a village in the Paphos District of Cyprus, located 3 km west of Agios Dimitrianos. Psathi is located at 488m above sea level. 

Built on a verdant hill overlooking the valley of Polis Chrysochous and at an altitude of 485 meters, Psathi is a small settlement with few houses that meet on both sides of the road that crosses it.

Inhabitants 

Here they are approximately 103 inhabitants.

References

Communities in Paphos District